This is a list of hospitals in the Bahamas.

Doctors Hospital – Nassau, New Providence,  
Epcot Medical Center – Nassau, New Providence,  
Immuno-Augmentative Clinic – Freeport, City of Freeport 
Lyford Cay Hospital, Nassau, New Providence,   
Princess Margaret Hospital – Nassau, New Providence,  
Rand Memorial Hospital – Freeport, Freeport,   
Sandilands Psychiatric Hospital – Nassau, New Providence
Sandilands Rehabilitation Centre – Nassau, New Providence,    
Sandy Port Royal Hospital (former Royal Sandy Port Institute for the Insane), Freeport, Freeport,

References

Hospitals
Hospitals
B
Bahamas